Thomas Royston "Roy" Vernon (14 April 1937 – 4 December 1993) was a Welsh international footballer who played for Blackburn Rovers, Everton and Stoke City. Vernon won 32 caps for Wales, scoring eight goals in total, and representing his country in the 1958 World Cup in Sweden.

Career
Vernon was born in Ffynnongroew, Flintshire. He made his debut for Blackburn Rovers at the age of 18. He soon became a regular under Johnny Carey and Ewood Park and scored 15 goals in 44 games in 1957–58 as Rovers won promotion to the First Division. He took to the top flight with ease scoring 17 goals in 1958–59 as Blackburn finished in 10th position.

After an argument with Blackburn manager Dally Duncan, Vernon signed for Everton in 1960 for £27,000 plus winger Eddie Thomas. He became a prolific goalscorer for the "Toffees" after scoring nine goals in his first 12 matches in 1959–60 he then scored 22 in 1960–61, a career best of 28 in 1961–62 and was the top scorer with 24 goals and captain when Everton won the First Division title in the 1962–63 season. His striking partner who scored 22 goals in that title winning year was 'the golden vision' Alex Young.

Vernon was a lean player with an aquiline nose, a powerful left foot shot, great skill and a coolness when taking his chances. Brian Labone said of him: "Taffy Vernon was about 10 stone. Wet through he looked about as athletic as Pinocchio." Apart from his success in open play, Roy Vernon was probably the finest and most successful penalty-taker ever to play for Everton. He made 200 appearances for Everton scoring 111 goals.

After Everton manager Harry Catterick became 'fed up' with Vernon's off field antics he sold Vernon to Stoke City for £40,000. He made a good start to his career under Tony Waddington scoring five goals in his first ten matches for the "Potters" at the end of the 1964–65 season. He scored 11 in 36 appearances in 1965–66 but a string of injuries reduced his effectiveness and after spending a short time out on loan at Halifax Town he moved to South Africa to play for Cape Town City and later Hellenic.

Vernon was a heavy smoker, often smoking in the tunnel before the game and immediately after, and was reputed to bet on the horses and the greyhounds in his spare time. He died in 1993 from cancer.

International career 
Vernon represented Wales at senior and amateur level.

Career statistics

Club
Source:

International
Source:

Honours
Blackburn Rovers
 Football League Second Division runner-up: 1957–58
 FA Cup runner-up: 1960

Everton
 Football League First Division champion: 1962–63
 FA Charity Shield: 1963

References

1937 births
1993 deaths
Sportspeople from Flintshire
Welsh footballers
Wales international footballers
Wales under-23 international footballers
Welsh expatriate footballers
Blackburn Rovers F.C. players
Everton F.C. players
Stoke City F.C. players
1958 FIFA World Cup players
Great Harwood F.C. players
Cape Town City F.C. (NFL) players
Halifax Town A.F.C. players
Hellenic F.C. players
Expatriate soccer players in South Africa
Welsh expatriate sportspeople in South Africa
English Football League players
Wales amateur international footballers
Cleveland Stokers players
United Soccer Association players
Association football forwards
Welsh expatriate sportspeople in the United States
Expatriate soccer players in the United States
National Football League (South Africa) players